Mahendravarman is a royal title bestowed on rulers of Hindu kingdoms

Rulers
 Mahendravarman (Varman dynasty) (reigned 470–494), king of Kamarupa, India
 Mahendravarman (Chenla) (reigned 590-611), king of Chenla, modern day Cambodia
 Mahendravarman I (600–630), Pallava king of South India
 Mahendravarman II (reigned 668–672), Pallava king and grandson of Mahendravarman I